Kurultai (Mongolian: , Хуралдай, Khuraldai) was a political and military council of ancient Mongol and Turkic chiefs and khans. The root of the word is Proto-Mongolic *kura-, *kurija- "to collect, to gather" from which is formed khural meaning "meeting" or "assembly" in Turkic and Mongolian languages. Khuraldai, khuruldai or khuraldaan means "gathering" or, more literally, "intergatheration". From this same root arises the Mongolian word хурим (khurim), which means "feast" and originally referred to large festive gatherings on the steppe but is used mainly in the sense of "wedding" in modern times.

Mongol Empire

All Great Khans of the Mongol Empire, for example Genghis Khan and Ögedei Khan, were formally elected in a Kurultai; khans of subordinate Mongol states, such as the Golden Horde, were elected by a similar regional Kurultai.

During the Kurultai, Mongol Chiefs would all convene in order to choose the next Great Khan. The Kurultai, oftentimes but not always held in the capital of the Mongolian empire, were also a time to assign all critical positions of leadership as well as an opportunity to decide the militaristic direction to be implemented under the new Khan and aforementioned new leadership.

After the new khan has been elected, an elaborate enthronement procedure followed. Johann Schiltberger, a 15th-century German traveler, described the installation of a new Golden Horde khan as follows
(quoted in):

Russian princes and boyars, who often had to wait in Sarai for the Kurultai to elect a new khan, who would then re-issue their yarlyks (patents), would no doubt often witness this khan kutermiak rituals, which became increasingly more frequent and futile during the mid-14th-century time of troubles in the Horde, giving rise to the Russian word "кутерьма" (kuter'ma), meaning "running around pointlessly".

Kurultai were imperial and tribal assemblies convened to determine, strategize and analyze military campaigns and assign individuals to leadership positions and titles. Genghis Khan was declared Khan in the Kurultai of 1206 CE. Most of the major military campaigns were first planned out at assemblies such as this and there were minor and less significant Kurultai under the Mongol Empire under political subordinate leaders and generals.

The Kurultai, however, required the presence of the senior members of the tribes participating, who were also military leaders. Thus, the deaths of Ögedei and Möngke in 1241 CE and 1259 CE, respectively, necessitated the withdrawal of Mongol leaders (and troops) from the outskirts of Vienna and Venice (in 1241) and from Syria (in 1259), hamstringing military operations against the Austrians and Mamluks that might otherwise have continued.

Although the Kurultai was a serious political event in the Mongol world, it was also a festival of sorts including great feasting and various traditional games. Many of these traditions have been carried on in the modern-day Mongolian event Naadam, which includes Mongolian wrestling, horse racing and archery competitions.

Modern usage

Politics
Various modern Mongol and Turkic peoples use it in the political or administrative sense, as a synonym for parliament, congress, conference, council, assembly, convention, gathering. Examples are: the World Qoroltai of the Bashkirs, Qurultay of the Crimean Tatar People, the National Kurultai of Kazakhstan, the People's Kurultai of Kyrgyzstan, the State Great Khural of Mongolia, the People's Khural of Buryatia, El Kurultai of Altai Republic and Kurultáj held today in Hungary.

Language
In Mongolian, the following forms of the word are still in use today: khuraldai, khuraldaan and khural. Ulsin Deed Shuukhiin Khuraldaan means "session of the National Supreme Court".

Other spellings include: kurultay, qurultay, qurıltai, qorıltay, and qoroltay.

The word has several modern usages in the modern Turkish language as well, e.g. Yükseköğretim Kurulu "Higher Education Council", genel kurul toplantısı "general board meeting". Kurultay is also a commonly-used word in modern Turkish meaning "general assembly", such as for organisations, committees etc. Kurulmak is also a verb in Turkish meaning "to be established". It is also used for "extraordinary conventions" of political parties.

See also

 Great Kurultáj
 Legislature
 Loya Jirga
 Naadam
 State Great Khural
 Thing (assembly)
 Veche
 Witenagemot
 World Nomad Games
 World Turks Qurultai

Footnotes

References

External links
 Qurultay of the Crimean Tatar people
 A video (in the Bashkir language) about the Second World Qoroltay of the Bashkirs

Mongolian words and phrases
Historical legislatures
History of the Turkic peoples
Mongol Empire